Hyperolius thoracotuberculatus is a purported species of frog in the family Hyperoliidae. It is only known from the imprecise type locality "Africa" and is not possible to match this name with any living populations of frogs. It can be considered as nomen dubium or as a nomen inquirendum. The common name warty reed frog has been coined for it.

References

thoracotuberculatus
Frogs of Africa
Amphibians described in 1931
Taxa named by Ernst Ahl
Taxonomy articles created by Polbot